The Frozen Hours is a novel about the Korean War, which tells the dramatic story of the Americans and the Chinese who squared off in one of the deadliest campaigns in the annals of combat: the Battle of Chosin Reservoir, also known as Frozen Chosin.

External links
Official Website

References

2017 American novels
American historical novels
Novels by Jeffrey Shaara
Ballantine Books books
Novels set during the Korean War
Novels set in South Hamgyong Province